Mwata Yamvo was a 16th-century founding ruler of the Lunda Kingdom including Suku, mbumba, yaka, Lozi, impangala, and the title given to all subsequent rulers or paramount chiefs of the Lunda (or Luunda or Ruund) people to the present day. The name has variety of spellings: Mwaante Yah-mvu, Mwaant Yaav, Muata Jamvo, Mwata Yamfwa.

See also
 List of Mwata Yamvo rulers
 Mwata Kazembe

References 

Year of death unknown
Year of birth unknown
16th-century rulers in Africa